The 2011 IIHF InLine Hockey World Championship Division I was the 16th Division I tournament of the IIHF InLine Hockey World Championship. It took place between 19 and 25 June in the Czech Republic. The games were played in the ČEZ Aréna in Ostrava.

Venue

Qualification
Played in Namibia

Nations
The following eight nations qualified for the Division I tournament.

Seeding and groups

The seeding in the preliminary round was based on the final standings at the 2010 IIHF InLine Hockey World Championship and 2010 IIHF InLine Hockey World Championship Division I. The teams were grouped accordingly by seeding at the previous year's tournament (in parenthesis is the corresponding seeding):

Group A
 (9)
 (12)
 (13)
 (16)

Group B
 (10)
 (11)
 (14)
 (15)

Preliminary round
Eight participating teams were placed in the following two groups. After playing a round-robin, every team advanced to the Playoff round.

Group A

All times are local (UTC+2).

Group B

All times are local (UTC+2).

Playoff round

Quarterfinals
All times are local (UTC+2).

Placement round
All times are local (UTC+2).

Semifinals
All times are local (UTC+2).

Bronze medal game
Time is local (UTC+2).

Promotion round
Time is local (UTC+2).

See also
2011 IIHF InLine Hockey World Championship

References

External links

IIHF InLine Hockey World Championship
IIHF InLine Hockey World Championship Division I
IIHF InLine Hockey World Championship Division I
2011 in inline hockey
Sports competitions in Pardubice
Inline hockey in the Czech Republic